The Firozkohi are a sub-tribe of the Chahar Aimaq ethnic group in Afghanistan, one of the four major Aimaq tribes, which also include the Jamshidi, Taymani, and Taimuri. In 1987, the Firozkohi were the second-largest Aymaq tribe, after the Taymani. The Hazaras of Qala-i Nau are also included in the Aimaq confederacy. The Firozkohi speak the Aimaq dialect of Dari Persian and claim Pashtun descent. They are named after Firozkoh, the medieval capital of the Ghurid dynasty.

The Firozkohi are semi-nomadic and inhabit the valleys of the Murghab River, largely in Badghis Province.

Descent and origin
The traditional chiefs of the northern Firozkohi tribe are known as Zay Ḥākem. They claim descent from Achakzai Pashtuns, whereas the tribe takes its name from Firozkoh, the capital of the Ghurid dynasty.

See also
 Aimaq people
 Hazaras

References

Aymaq
Ethnic groups in Badghis Province
Modern nomads